GNTV may refer to:
 A-1,6-mannosyl-glycoprotein 6-b-N-acetylglucosaminyltransferase, an enzyme
 GMA News TV